La Fama was a Mexican reality series set to find a new child star in 1999. It was mainly a singing competition, but it also provided dancing and acting lessons to the contestants.

Participants
Fourteen children (seven boys and seven girls) aged 8–12 were chosen in a nationwide search to enter the new competition.

Judging
Contestants were scored every week on their performances, on a scale of 1–10.

Up For elimination
Each week, the two contestants that scored the fewest points were put up for elimination. Each received a number for support from the public. The one who received the lowest number of votes was eliminated.

Stages
The 14 contestants started at the Beginner Stage. Once five people were eliminated the Intermediate Stage began. The Professional or Pro Stage began when the four finalists were revealed. The winner was known as the Graduate: the only one who passed all three stages.

Prize
The winner received a record deal and an acting contract for a telenovela.

Contestants

 The Graduate / Winner of La Fama.
 Pro Stage Contestants / Finalists
 Intermediate Stage Contestants
 Beginner Stage Contestants

Mexican reality television series